Lapointe (or La Pointe) is a commune in the Port-de-Paix Arrondissement, in the Nord-Ouest department of Haiti. Once a communal section, a presidential decree on 22 July 2015 made it a commune.

References

Populated places in Nord-Ouest (department)
Communes of Haiti